Valérie Barthelemy (born 30 April 1991) is a Belgian triathlete. She represented Belgium at the 2020 Summer Olympics in Tokyo 2021, competing in triathlon.

Barthelemy also competes in Super League Triathlon. She finished 3rd in the Arena Games, Rotterdam 2020. 

Her achievements include a bronze medal in Mixed team relay at the 2018 European Triathlon Championships.

Barthelemy swam collegiately for the University of Michigan.

References

External links
 

 

1991 births
Living people
Belgian female triathletes
Triathletes at the 2020 Summer Olympics
Olympic triathletes of Belgium
Michigan Wolverines women's swimmers
21st-century Belgian women